Azot is one of the biggest manufacturers of nitrogen fertilizers in Ukraine. The chemical plant, better known as Cherkaskyi Azot, is a part of bigger chemical holding Ostchem Holding owned by Ukrainian oligarch Dmytro Firtash. It unites several other chemical plants in Ukraine and some former Soviet republics that specialize in manufacturing of fertilizers.

The construction of this plant began in 1962 and on March 14, 1965, the first batch of liquid ammonia was produced. The plant's name, Azot, means nitrogen.

The facilities have the capacity to produce up to 3 million tonnes of fertilizers per year. 
The products of the plant can be exported to Asia, Europe and America.

The products include:
 weak nitric acid
 granular Ammonium Nitrate 
 liquid Ammonia
 UREA prilled
 Urea-ammonium nitrate (UAN)
 aqueous ammonia
 Ammonium Sulphate
 crystalline ammonium sulfate
 Caprolactam crystalline and liquid
 liquefied carbon Dioxide
 Ion-exchange resins  
 Cationite (ion-exchange resins)

The 2022 Russian invasion of Ukraine is restraining export and import (the Black Sea harbours are blocked by the Russian Navy) of raw materials, resources, fertilizers and grain. 
It is also restraining agriculture in Ukraine.

Charity 
Dmytro Firtash, chairman of the Board of Directors of Group DF, Chairman of the Federation of Employers of Ukraine, advocates that city-forming and large enterprises help the cities in which they are located. Thus, in the framework of the social program "Save your city", initiated by Dmitry Firtash, the company renovated the House of Culture "Friendship of Peoples", the square and the fountain in front of him. The company also provided financial support to the local boarding school in the amount of UAH 500,000. Group DF companies systematically help children's institutions. In particular, Cherkasy-based Azot, since joining the OSTCHEM holding (April 2011), has allocated more than UAH 1.3 million to provide material assistance to schools, kindergartens and orphanages. The company also provided financial support to the local boarding school in the amount of UAH 500,000.

References

Chemical companies of the Soviet Union
Fertilizer companies of Ukraine